Zegart is a surname. Notable people with the surname include:

Amy Zegart (born 1967), American academic
Arthur Zegart (1916–1989), American documentary film producer
Shelly Zegart (born 1941), American quilter